The Parcours botanique au fil de l'Indre is an arboretum and botanical garden located in Montbazon, Indre-et-Loire, Centre-Val de Loire, France. It is open daily without charge.

The botanical area consists of the Grande Rouge, a château's forest park, and the Grande Ilette, a riverside area. The park is primarily oak but also contains notable trees, including cypress, a Sequoiadendron planted circa 1890–1900, and a Taxodium distichum, as well as hornbeam, beech, maple, chestnut, American locust, and Scotch fir. The Grande Ilette lies along the banks of the river Indre, and contains a meadow as well as exotic plantings of Alnus cordata, bald cypress, black walnut, and Sequoia sempervirens.

See also 
 List of botanical gardens in France

References 
 Jardins de France entry
 Jardins de France article (French)
 Parcs et Jardins entry (French)

Indre, Parcours botanique au fil de l'
Indre, Parcours botanique au fil de l'